Lost in White is a 2016 Chinese action crime mystery thriller film directed by Xu Wei. It was released in China on April 15, 2016.

Plot

Lost in White takes places in the north-east of China, where two bodies have been found under the ice of a frozen lake. At the -40 degree, Captain Zhou and young detective Wang Hao struggle to find out the truth.

Cast
Tony Leung Ka-fai
Tong Dawei
Zhou Dongyu
Deng Jiajia
Vision Wei
Cao Weiyu

Reception
The film grossed  on its opening weekend in China.

References

External links

Chinese mystery thriller films
Chinese action thriller films
Chinese crime thriller films
2010s mystery thriller films
2016 action thriller films
2016 crime thriller films
2010s Mandarin-language films